Saint is an American Christian metal band, first active in the mid-1980s, releasing their first album Warriors of the Son in 1984. Common themes of Saint's music include hell, evil, and apocalyptic themes such as the End times. In 2010, HM magazine ranked the band's albums Time's End and Hell Blade among Top 100 Christian metal albums of all-time list on No. 67 and No. 46 respectively.

Line up 

Current members
 Dave Nelson – vocals
 Jerry Johnson – guitars
 Richard Lynch – bass
 Jared Knowland – drums
 Matthew P. Smith – guitars

Former members
 Brian Miller – vocals
 Josh Kramer – vocals
 Dee Harrington – guitars
 Tim Lamberson – vocals, drums
 John Mahan – guitars, backing vocals
 Gene McClendon – drums
 Brian Willis – drums
 John Perrine – drums
 Larry London – drums
 Mike Lowery – drums
 Nick Bean – drums
 Bill Brost – drums
 Russell Koch – bass
 Jim Maxwell – drums

Discography with track listing

Warriors of the Son (1984 Rotten)
 "Plan II"
 "Legions of the Dead"
 "Abyss"
 "Warriors of the Son"
 "Vicars of Fate"
 "Time's Wasting"

Time's End (1986 Pure Metal)
 "In the Night"
 "Island Prisoner"
 "Space Cruiser"
 "Through You"
 "Time's End"
 "Primed and Ready"
 "Destroyers"
 "Phantom of the Galaxy/Steel Killer"
 "Steel Killer (reprise)"

Too Late for Living (1988 Pure Metal/2000 Armor)

 "Too Late for Living"
 "Star Pilot"
 "Accuser"
 "The Rock"
 "On the Street"
 "Returning"
 "The Path"
 "Through the Sky"
 "The War Is Over"

The Perfect Life (EP) (1999 Armor)
 "The Runner"
 "Raise Your Hands"
 "Show His Love"
 "To Live Forever"
 "The Perfect Life"
 "Deceived"

In the Battle (2003 Armor)
 "In the Battle"
 "Star Pilots Return"
 "Here We Are"
 "Sacrifice"
 "Holy Rollin'"
 "Ryders"
 "The Choice"
 "When"
 "Acid Rain/Full Armor"

Warriors of the Son (Re-Recorded) (2004 Armor)
 "Plan II"
 "Legions of the Dead"
 "Abyss"
 "Warriors of the Son"
 "Vicars of Fate"
 "Time's Wasting"
 "Killers & the Destroyers"
 "The Reaper"

Live 05 (2005 Armor)
 "Sacrifice"
 "Vicars of Fate"
 "In the Battle"
 "Holy Rollin'"
 "The Path"
 "In the Night"
 "Warriors of the Son"
 "Here We Are"
 "Too Late for Living"
 "Primed and Ready"
 "Ryders"
 "Full Armor"
 "Plan II"

The Mark (2006 Armor)
 "The Spirit"
 "The Vision"
 "Ride to Kill"
 "He Reigns"
 "On & On"
 "The 7th Trumpet"
 "The Mark"
 "Bowls of Wrath"
 "Babylon the Great"
 "Reaping the Flesh"
 "Gog & Magog"
 "Alfa & Omega"

Crime Scene Earth (2007 Armor)
 "The Conquest"
 "Half a Times Measure"
 "Terror in the Sky"
 "Everlasting God"
 "Crime Scene Earth"
 "The Judas in Me"
 "Too Many"
 "Invader"
 "Bended Knee"
 "Lost"

Hell Blade (2010 Retroactive)
 "The Ascent"
 "The Blade"
 "To the Cross"
 "Crying in the Night"
 "Hell Train"
 "Endless Night"
 "You and Me"
 "New World Order"
 "SinnerPeace"
 "Hell Blade"

Desperate Night (AMOR) 2012 
 "The Crucible"
 "Crusified"
 "The Key"
 "End of the World"
 "Let It Rock"
 "In the Fray"
 "Inside Out"
 "Desperate Night"
 "Zombie Shuffle (Josh Kramer)"
 "Judgement"
 "To Live Forever"
 "Escape from the Fire"
 "The Crucible Reprise"

Broad is the Gate (2014) 
 "Broad is the Gate"
 "Hero"
 "We All Stand"
 "Demon Pill"
 "We Will Fight"
 "Who You Are"
 "Reach the Sky"
 "Never Same"
 "Metal Cross"

The Calf (2019) 
 "The Calf"
 "Another Day"
 "Psalm 23"
 "Rise"
 "Fine Line"
 "Stormy Night"
 "Fragile"
 "Hell to Pay"
 "The Fall"
 "God Is God"

References

External links
 Official website

American Christian metal musical groups
Heavy metal musical groups from Oregon
Musical groups established in 1980
1980 establishments in Oregon
1989 disestablishments in Oregon
Musicians from Salem, Oregon

sl:Grmičarji